Cookstown United Football Club was a Northern Irish, intermediate football club that played in the B Division of the Irish League from 1990 to 2001. The club folded during the 2001-02 season. The club played in the Irish Cup in 1982-83.

References 

Association football clubs in County Tyrone
Defunct association football clubs in Northern Ireland
Association football clubs disestablished in 2002
2002 disestablishments in Northern Ireland